The Omega Virus is a talking electronic board game released by Milton Bradley in 1992.  It involves collecting weapons and room keys to destroy the computer virus which has taken over a space station while either hurting or helping your fellow players.

Creator
Michael Gray designed The Omega Virus board game. He also created the boardgames Mall Madness, and Dream Phone.

Story/plot
It is the year 2051. Earth is now orbited by the great Battlesat1 station which protects earth from meteor impacts and stray comets with a super payload of plasma weapon silos.  However, during a routine maintenance operation, something goes horribly wrong, and the station's master computer is infested by microscopic nano-phages that build a singular intelligence (foreign AI) in the computer core. While the humans aboard the station are forced to evacuate as all support systems shut down, the Earth leadership is contacted by the entity known as the Omega Virus, which threatens to turn the Battlesat's plasma weapons upon the planet.  A power struggle ensues between four major global powers (the North American Federation, the Euro-National Force, the Oceanic Republic, and the Asiatic Alliance) to send a single techno-combatant to destroy the Virus (and potentially the other techno-combatants) and gain control of the Battlesat station for their government. The Techno combatants depart the Hauser air force base on individual craft, each bound for one of the station's four functioning docking bays where they will battle the Omega Virus – and each other – for control of the space station before the fiendish virus overloads the battle station's master computer and eliminates the techno-warriors.

Gameplay
The Omega Virus consists of a folding game board, an interactive electronic console that holds the game's weapons, probes and access cards; four folding cardboard-and-stand panels with a slot for the player's access cards, and four commandos.

Commandos and probes are the primary pawns of the game. They came in four colors: red, green, blue, and yellow. Each player starts out in the color-sector that matches their commando, each of which has a corresponding docking bay. The probes are placed in a peg in the central console that corresponds to each sector.

Play begins by selecting the number of players and the duration of the game. Each player then enters a secret code which would prove useful in accomplishing the game's objective.

The commando is the only pawn available initially; it moves three adjacent squares to enter a room. Rooms are entered by typing their three digit identifier into the console. Regardless of a player's color, green rooms are the only accessible ones at first.

Game actions are communicated through two voices, one of the besieged Battlesat1 computer and the other of the Virus itself. The computer said phrases like "Help me. We are running out of time." while the Virus mocked the computer and the players. One would inevitably hear "You human scum" or "You fools" in a gratingly smug voice at some point during the game. The Virus also enjoyed inter-player attacks: "Green is attacking yellow. What fun! Green, take your best shot."

Within a room, a variety of results could occur. One is that the electronic console would say "Nothing here." in which case the turn is relatively futile. The player might also find a beneficial item: these consisted of colored access cards, which enabled the player to enter different colored rooms; a probe (more later); and one of the three weapons needed to defeat the game's antagonist, The Omega Virus. On the negative side, one might be attacked by the Omega Virus itself. At the end of the turn, the console would say "code XX" where XX is a two digit number. If the code matched what the player put in as their secret code at the beginning, the Omega Virus is known to be located in that room. Also on the negative side, a player could be transported to a random docking bay.

In the event of an attack by the Omega Virus, the player would be given the option to, depending on the number of weapons the player possessed, press one to three buttons out of a possible four in total (0,1,2,R). If the player did not press the same buttons that the Omega Virus has attacked with, an item (access card or weapon) would be destroyed. Additionally, if two players ended up occupying the same room, they could attack each other. The procedure is much the same, except the attacking player would be asked to push one button to launch an attack. The defense is the same method as if the Omega Virus were attacking.

A player could stumble across their corresponding probe in one of the rooms. The probe pawn was placed next to the player and then a second turn was granted in the form of moving the probe. The probe could move any number of spaces that are connected, but could not bypass rooms within a single turn. This enabled a player to explore the board more rapidly. It, like the player's commando pawn, could also initiate and receive attacks.

As the game progressed, the Omega Virus would "shut down" sectors he did not occupy. In this case, the cardboard flap would be folded over the said sector and all players in it were teleported to another sector's docking bay of their choosing.

Through the player's explorations, once the code and all three weapon items were found, the player was to go to the Omega Virus room and then attack the virus using the same attack methods as before. A player who guessed the correct button to press was declared the winner. Otherwise, the timer ran out and the game was lost for all parties.

References

External links

Science fiction board games
Board games introduced in 1992
Milton Bradley Company games
Electronic board games
Fictional computer viruses